Vivienne Sonia Segal (April 19, 1897 – December 29, 1992) was an American actress and singer.

Early years
Segal was born on April 19, 1897, in Philadelphia, Pennsylvania. She was the elder daughter of Jewish parents Bernhard Segal, a physician, and Paula (née Hahn) Segal, who encouraged Vivienne and her sisters Vera and Louise to seek careers in show business. Her obituary in The Guardian reported that her father "underwrote a local opera company in order to give her the chance to sing." She studied singing with Estelle Liebling, the voice teacher of Beverly Sills.

Career 
Segal's career began when she was 15 years old and began performing with the Philadelphia Operatic Society. Her Broadway debut came in The Blue Paradise (1915), a production that was underwritten by her father. In 1924 and 1925, she was a member of the Ziegfeld Follies. She was also a performer on the CBS Radio program Accordiana in 1934.

Segal may be best remembered for creating the role of Vera Simpson in Richard Rodgers and Lorenz Hart's Pal Joey and introducing the song "Bewitched, Bothered and Bewildered". Pal Joey opened at the Ethel Barrymore Theatre December 25, 1940, with a cast that included Gene Kelly and June Havoc. She also starred as Morgan LeFay in the Rodgers and Hart revival of A Connecticut Yankee in 1942. One of Lorenz Hart's last songs, "To Keep My Love Alive",  was written specifically for her in this show.

Since the 1940 Pal Joey production went unrecorded, a studio cast was assembled in 1950 to record the musical. In 2003, this recording was reissued on CD by Columbia Broadway Masterworks in a release featuring the full show's numbers plus two bonus tracks: Harold Lang singing "I Could Write a Book" (from the CBS TV show Shower of Stars) and Segal singing "Bewitched, Bothered and Bewildered" on the CBS Radio show Stage Struck, interviewed by Mike Wallace recalling Hart's promise to write her a show. In 1952, she played in Pal Joey again, when it was revived on Broadway.

Vivienne Segal retired from acting in 1966 following a guest appearance on Perry Mason as Pauline Thorsen in "The Case of the Tsarina's Tiara."

Awards
In 1952, Segal received a Donaldson Award in the Best Performance-Actress (Musical Division) category for her performance in the revival of Pal Joey.

Personal life and death
Segal and actor Robert Ames eloped in 1923 but divorced three years later. In 1950, she married television executive Hubbell Robinson, Jr.

Segal died in Beverly Hills, California of heart failure on December 29, 1992, aged 95. She was interred in the Westwood Village Memorial Park Cemetery in Los Angeles.

Musical theater
 1915 The Blue Paradise
 1917 My Lady's Glove
 1917 Miss 1917
 1918 Oh, Lady! Lady!!
 1919 The Little Whopper
 1921 A Dangerous Maid (as a replacement)
 1922 The Yankee Princess
 1923 Adrienne
 1924 Ziegfeld Follies
 1925 Ziegfeld Follies
 1925 Florida Girl
 1926 Castles in the Air
 1926 The Desert Song
 1928 The Three Musketeers
 1931 The Chocolate Soldier
 1938 I Married an Angel
 1940 Pal Joey
 1943 A Connecticut Yankee Broadway revival
 1947 Music in My Heart
 1950 Great to Be Alive!
 1952 Pal Joey Broadway revival

Films

References

Sources
 Sies, Luther F. Encyclopedia of American Radio: 1920-1960.  Jefferson, North Carolina: McFarland, 2000.

External links

 
 
 Vivienne Segal photographs, 1870s-1972 (bulk 1915-1938), held by the Billy Rose Theatre Division, New York Public Library for the Performing Arts

1897 births
1992 deaths
20th-century American actresses
20th-century American singers
20th-century American women singers
Actresses from Philadelphia
American film actresses
American musical theatre actresses
American radio actresses
American television actresses
Burials at Westwood Village Memorial Park Cemetery
Donaldson Award winners
Jewish American actresses
Musicians from Philadelphia
Singers from Pennsylvania
Ziegfeld girls
20th-century American Jews